Tonino Zugarelli (born 17 January 1950) is a retired professional tennis player from Italy.

Zugarelli won 1 singles and 1 doubles title on the Grand Prix tennis tour during his career.  He was also a member of the Italian team that won the 1976 Davis Cup.

Grand Prix circuit finals

Singles (1)

Doubles (1)

See also
 Tennis in Italy

References

External links
 

1950 births
Living people
Italian male tennis players
Tennis players from Rome
Mediterranean Games bronze medalists for Italy
Mediterranean Games medalists in tennis
Competitors at the 1971 Mediterranean Games